The word forro could refer to:
 The Forro people, an ethnic group in São Tomé and Príncipe
 The Forro Creole, spoken by those people
 Forró, a style of music and dance from northeastern Brazil